Jackson is a city in and the county seat of Madison County, Tennessee, United States. Its total population was 68,205 as of the 2020 United States census. 
Jackson is the primary city of the Jackson, Tennessee metropolitan area, which is included in the Jackson-Humboldt, Tennessee combined statistical area. Jackson is Madison County's largest city, and the second-largest city in West Tennessee next to Memphis. It is home to the Tennessee Supreme Court's courthouse for West Tennessee, as Jackson was the major city in the west when the court was established in 1834.

In the antebellum era, Jackson was the market city for an agricultural area based on cultivation of cotton, the major commodity crop. Beginning in 1851, the city became a hub of railroad systems ultimately connecting to major markets in the north and south, as well as east and west. This was key to its development, attracting trade and many workers on the railroads in the late 19th century with the construction of railroads after the American Civil War. Through the 1960s, the city was served by 15 passenger trains daily, but industry restructuring reduced such service and caused the loss of jobs. The economy has adjusted to new businesses, with major manufacturing in the area.

History

Early settlement

This area was occupied by the historic Chickasaw people at the time of European encounter. They were pushed out by European-American settlers under various treaties with the United States, in actions authorized by the Indian Removal Act of 1830 and ratified by the US Senate.

European-American settlement of Jackson began along the Forked Deer River before 1820, primarily by migrants from eastern areas of the Upper South, such as Virginia and Kentucky.  Originally named Alexandria, the city was renamed in 1822 to honor General Andrew Jackson, a hero of the War of 1812. He was later elected as President of the United States.

The City of Jackson was founded by an act of the Tennessee General Assembly, passed in 1821, entitled an "act to establish a seat of justice for Henry, Carroll, Henderson and Madison Counties." The act required  of land to be deeded to the commissioners. The commissioners chosen by the Legislature were Sterling Brewer and James Fentress. The places considered for the seat of justice were Alexandria, Golden's Station, and Jackson. The larger portion of the settlers at that time were living on Cotton Grove Road, and as Jackson was closer to them than either of the other settlements, this settlement was determined to be the more suitable site for the seat of justice.

At the time of the second Tennessee State Constitution in 1834, when the Tennessee Supreme Court was established, Memphis had not yet been developed. The county seat of Jackson was the most significant city in West Tennessee and this was designated as a site for the State Supreme Court in this part of the state.

The city of Jackson did not establish public elections until 1837, with a Board of Aldermen elected at-large. From 1854 to 1915, Jackson had a Board of Aldermen of eight members elected from four districts, each with two members elected at-large. Free people of color and freedmen were not allowed to vote in the state until after passage of federal constitutional amendments following the Civil War that granted them citizenship and suffrage.

This area was initially developed for agricultural purposes, especially cotton plantations for producing the chief commodity crop of the Mississippi Valley and Deep South. Cotton plantations were dependent on the labor of African-American slaves and thousands were brought into the area as it was developed. As county seat, Jackson was a trading town and retail center for surrounding agricultural areas.

But developing as a railroad hub of several lines was most important to Jackson's industrial and population growth, from 1852 on for the next hundred years.

Civil War through 19th century
In 1862 Tennessee came under the control of Union forces and was occupied until General Ulysses S. Grant decided to concentrate his efforts to the South. Between December 11, 1862 and January 1, 1863, an engagement at Jackson occurred during Confederate Brigadier General Nathan Bedford Forrest's expedition into West Tennessee. Forrest wanted to disrupt the rail supply line to Grant's army, which was campaigning along the route of the Mississippi Central Railroad. If Forrest destroyed the Mobile & Ohio Railroad running south from Columbus, Kentucky through Jackson, Grant would have to curtail or halt his operations altogether.

Forrest's 2,100-man cavalry brigade crossed the Tennessee River on December 17. Grant ordered a soldier concentration at Jackson under Brigadier General Jeremiah C. Sullivan and sent a cavalry force under Colonel Robert G. Ingersoll. Forrest's command defeated the Union cavalry in Lexington, Tennessee on December 18. As Forrest continued his advance the following day, Sullivan ordered Colonel Adolph Englemann to take a small force northeast of Jackson.

At Old Salem Cemetery, acting on the defensive, Englemann's two infantry regiments repulsed a Confederate mounted attack, then withdrew a mile closer to the city. The fight amounted to no more than a feint and show of force intended to hold Jackson's Union defenders in position, while two mounted Confederate columns destroyed railroad track to both the north and south of the town, then returned. Forrest withdrew from the Jackson area to attack Trenton and Humboldt after this mission was accomplished.

As a result of the destruction of the railroad, Grant abandoned his plans to invade Mississippi from Tennessee in favor of an attack on Vicksburg, Mississippi, for control of the river. Federal troops left Jackson and moved to Memphis, which became a major center for Union troops for the duration of the war. Forrest returned to Jackson in early 1864 and used the city as his headquarters as his forces attacked Federal positions in northern West Tennessee and Fort Pillow, a Union position on the Mississippi north of Memphis. Forrest returned to Jackson again later that year in preparation for an attack on Federal river traffic on the Tennessee River east of Paris and the supply base at Johnsonville.

With the emancipation of slaves and passage of US constitutional amendments granting suffrage to African-American males, Jackson's freedmen and formerly free people of color began to participate in the political system. But secret vigilante groups, such as the Ku Klux Klan, developed chapters in Tennessee and throughout the South that intimidated and attacked freedmen in order to exercise white supremacy. As Reconstruction continued, they worked to suppress the black Republican vote.

In the late 19th century, the white-dominated state legislature passed several laws that made voter registration and voting more difficult, including payment of a poll tax, and resulted in reducing voting by many blacks and poor whites. After Reconstruction, white violence increased against blacks. In 1886, Eliza Woods, an African-American woman, was lynched in Jackson after being accused of poisoning and killing her employer, Jessie Woolen. Woolen's husband later confessed to the crime. Two other African Americans were known to have been lynched by whites in Madison County in this period that extended into the early 20th century.

20th century
In 1915, Jackson was one of several cities in the state to adopt a commission form of government, changing its electoral scheme to at-large voting citywide for three designated positions: a mayor and two commissioners. This resulted in a government dominated by the majority, with no representatives elected from minority populations. (Other cities to make this change included Clarksville, Chattanooga, Knoxville and Nashville.) Although the state in 1913 enacted a law enabling cities to adopt the commission form of government independently, Jackson was chartered by the state for this change. The commissioners each were allocated specific responsibilities, for instance, for the school system and city departments.

In the late 19th century, the state of Tennessee had already adopted residency requirements, voting process, and poll taxes that sharply reduced the ability of African Americans to register and vote. The City Charter was amended to include run-off elections within two weeks in cases of one candidate not receiving a majority of votes. This created an extra burden on campaigns by less wealthy candidates. In Jackson, the total effect of these changes to the city electoral system was to reduce the ability of African Americans in the 20th century to elect candidates of their choice and to participate in the political system.

In 1977, the former company town of Bemis just south of Jackson was annexed by the city of Jackson.

In 1977 three city residents filed suit against the city in US District Court, in Buchanan v. City of Jackson (1988), (683 F.Supp. 1515), challenging the structure and electoral system of the city government because the at-large voting had diluted the voting power of the city's significant minority of African-American residents. (According to the 1980 Census, the city population was 49,074, of which 16,847, or 34.3%, were black.) Since 1915, no black person had ever been elected to, or served on, the Board of Commissioners. The court found this commission electoral system was found to be discriminatory in effect. Over the decades, the African-American minority was effectively closed out of city government. The case was appealed and affirmed; the defendants ultimately proposed a new system approved in 1988 by the court. By a new city charter, in 1989 the city created a Board of Commission based on nine single-member districts for broader representation. The mayor is elected at-large.

Similar legal challenges to the electoral and city systems in Clarksville and Chattanooga led to changes in their city charters to establish more numerous members of a city council or board of commission, to be elected from single-member districts. As a result, more African-American and women candidates have been elected as representatives from those jurisdictions.

The dissolution of the former government in Jackson resulted in the need for an elected city school board, since one of the commissioners had previously managed education. The city commissioners chose to consolidate their school system with that of the Madison County, Tennessee school system in 1990, creating the Jackson-Madison County School Board. This was also done to achieve desegregation goals. The nine-member board is elected from six districts across the county; three districts elect two members each and the other three each elect one member. All members are elected for four-year terms, with elections held on a staggered basis every two years. The demographics of the county in 2012 for major ethnic groups were 60.3% white and 37% African American. In 2008 the school system was still under a court order supervising its desegregation progress.

In the post-World War II era, the railroad industry went through restructuring and mergers. (See section below). By the end of 1960s, it sharply reduced passenger service to Jackson; there were related losses of associated industrial jobs supporting the railroads, causing economic problems in the region.

1999 to present

Between 1999 and 2008, several violent tornadoes struck large portions of the city. The McKellar-Sipes Regional Airport was severely damaged in January 1999, a storm that resulted in eleven fatalities. The 1999 tornado also damaged the  Riverside Cemetery, where 40 known Confederate soldiers, 140 unknowns, and many families of the founders of Jackson are buried. The cemetery's acres of old trees and many of the statues, monuments, and graves were damaged during the tornado.

Parts of the Union University campus were damaged in November 2002. The downtown area was devastated in May 2003 by an F4 tornado, and there were eight deaths. Many dormitories at the Union campus were demolished in a storm in February 2008.

On May 1, 2010 a severe thunderstorm hit Jackson, dropping 13 inches of rain in a short period of time.  Flash floods destroyed many homes and streets.

Railroad history
Jackson developed rapidly just prior to the Civil War as a railroad junction and maintenance shop for several early railroads, including the Mississippi Central, the Tennessee Central and the Mobile and Ohio lines.  Located over seventy miles east of Memphis, Jackson lies along the shortest rail route between Cairo, IL; Jackson, MS (Mississippi's capital); and New Orleans, Louisiana.  As the railroad was extended from the Great Lakes to the Gulf of Mexico, Jackson, Tennessee was perfectly situated as a station along the north-south line; and, to serve as a junction between the north-south line, and lines east and west between Memphis and Nashville, the major cities of West and Middle Tennessee.

The first was the Mobile and Ohio Railroad, which began in October 1849 in Mobile, Alabama.  The line first entered Jackson in 1851. These tracks were completely destroyed during the Civil War. The line merged with the Gulf, Mobile and Northern Railroad in 1940 to become the Gulf, Mobile and Ohio Railroad. The second railroad to enter Jackson was the Mississippi Central & Tennessee. In 1873, the line was contracted and later controlled by the Illinois Central Railroad.

On December 29, 1886, the Tennessee Midland Railway received a charter to build a railroad from Memphis, Tennessee to the Virginia state line. The line from Memphis to Jackson was completed on June 1, 1888. In 1893, the Tennessee Midland went into receivership and was sold at foreclosure to the L&N Railroad. Around 1968 the remainder of the Tennessee Midland was abandoned east of Cordova with the exception of some track in Jackson, Tennessee. That track is now used to deliver goods to Jackson's east and west industrial parks.

The Tennessee Midland Railway Company line from Memphis to Jackson was the forerunner of the Nashville, Chattanooga and St. Louis Railway. This line was often referred to as the "NC" by locals. Like all other railroads to enter Jackson, it was built with funds subscribed by citizens and investors of Jackson.  The first passenger train entered Jackson from Memphis on June 1, 1888. The highly profitable railroad was merged into the Louisville and Nashville Railroad following WWII.  Eventually the L&N was merged into and is now part of CSX Transportation.

A charter was granted by the State of Tennessee on August 16, 1910, and construction began on July l, 1911.  The first sector extended from Jackson to the station of Tigrett, and by April 20, 1912,  of the line were ready for operations.  On June 16 the remaining  sector was set into service, connecting Dyersburg, Tennessee with Jackson.  When the line began operations in 1912, its president was Isaac B. Tigrett, a prominent young banker of Jackson.  The railroad became an important local thoroughfare, used to transport much of the produce of the region to market in Jackson and Dyersburg.  The Birmingham and Northwestern Railway Company had 4 locomotives, 5 passenger cars, and 92 freight cars.  When Isaac B. Tigrett became President of the GM&N in 1920, he ceased to direct the affairs of the Birmingham and Northwestern Railroad Company.  After he became president of the GM&O, the railroad was purchased and merged to become the Dyersburg branch.

Passenger trains in the 20th century

Jackson had been a west Tennessee hub for passenger train service. Passengers had direct service to Memphis, Nashville, Meridian, Montgomery, Mobile, Birmingham, Jacksonville, Daytona, Miami, Centralia, Champaign-Urbana, Springfield, Chicago, St. Louis, and New Orleans. From the 1930s to the 1960s, multiple regularly scheduled passenger trains of the Gulf, Mobile and Ohio and the Illinois Central made stops at Union Station.

Gulf, Mobile and Ohio trains included:
Gulf Coast Rebel (St. Louis, Missouri – Mobile, Alabama)
The Rebel (Chicago – New Orleans, Louisiana)

Illinois Central trains included:
The City of Miami (Chicago, Illinois – Miami, Florida)
The Floridan (Chicago – Miami)
The Seminole (Chicago – Jacksonville, Florida)
Sunchaser (Chicago and St. Louis – Miami)

Nashville, Chattanooga and St. Louis served at its own depot. Its trains included:
The City of Memphis  (Memphis – Nashville)

Most passenger trains were discontinued by 1959. The Seminole ended service in 1969. The City of Miami was the last train stopping in the city, on April 30, 1971.

Geography

Climate
According to the Köppen climate classification system, Jackson has a humid subtropical climate (Cfa), with hot, humid summers and cool winters.

Demographics

Jackson is the larger principal city of the Jackson-Humboldt CSA, a Combined Statistical Area that includes the Jackson metropolitan area (Chester and Madison counties) and the Humboldt micropolitan area (Gibson County), which had a combined population of 165,108 at the 2010 census.

2020 census

As of the 2020 United States census, there were 68,205 people, 25,925 households, and 16,075 families residing in the city.

2010 census
As of the census of 2010, there were 65,211 people, 25,191 households, and 15,951 families residing in the city. The population density was 1,317 people per square mile (423.4/km2). There were 28,052 housing units at an average density of 566.3 per square mile (218.9/km2). Since the 2010 Census, the city has added 9.4459 (24.5/km2). The racial makeup of the city was 49.2% White, 45.07% African American, 0.2% Native American, 1.2% Asian, 0.02% Pacific Islander, 2.3% from other races, and 1.5% from two or more races. Hispanic or Latino of any race were 4.0% of the population.

There were 25,191 households, out of which 29.7% had children under the age of 18 living with them, 37.6% were married couples living together, 21.4% had a female householder with no husband present, and 36.7% were non-families. 30.8% of all households were made up of individuals, and 10.59% had someone living alone who was 65 years of age or older. The average household size was 2.42 and the average family size was 3.03.

In the city, the population was spread out, with 24.7% under the age of 18, 13.4% from 18 to 24, 25.4% from 25 to 44, 23.8% from 45 to 64, and 12.7% who were 65 years of age or older. The median age was 33.8 years. For every 100 females, there were 87.4 males. For every 100 females age 18 and over, there were 81.7 males.

The median income for a household in the city was $38,169, and the median income for a family was $45,938. Males had a median income of $41,085 versus $30,436 for females. The per capita income for the city was $23,762. About 15.6% of families and 21.6% of the population were below the poverty line, including 36% of those under age 18 and 8.24% of those age 65 or over.

Crime

According to Morgan Quitno's 2010 Metropolitan Crime Rate Rankings  the Jackson metropolitan area had the 13th-highest crime rate in the United States.

The Morgan Quitno list of the "Top 25 Most Dangerous Cities of 2007", ranked Jackson's as the 9th most dangerous metropolitan area in the United States. In 2006, it had been listed as the 18th most dangerous.

Arts and culture
Jackson was the site of the now permanently closed International Rock-A-Billy Hall of Fame Museum, which recognized the contributions of Tennessee musicians to this genre.

As of April 2022, a large portion of the historic Downtown area has been officially designated by the Jackson City Council as the Arts District, and is home to the Ned R. McWherter West Tennessee Cultural Arts Center, known locally as "The Ned," as well as The Carnegie Center for Arts and History. Some of the art that is displayed in the area includes murals, performance art shows, galleries, live concerts, and theatrical/ballet productions. The district is also home to a number of small shops.

Sports

Minor League Baseball 
The Jackson Generals, a Double-A Minor League Baseball team of the Southern League played at The Ballpark at Jackson from 1998 to 2020. In conjunction with Major League Baseball's reorganization of the minor leagues after the 2020 season, the Generals were not invited to serve as any team's affiliate, effectively ending their run in affiliated baseball. The future of the team is uncertain. While, Major League Baseball has stated its intentions to assist cities like Jackson in joining independent baseball leagues, the team's lease requires them to maintain an affiliation with Major League Baseball to remain at their ballpark.

Originally known as the West Tenn Diamond Jaxx, the team changed its name to the Generals in 2011. The new name was in reference to the Jackson Generals who played in the Kentucky–Illinois–Tennessee League from 1935 to 1942 and 1950 to 1954. The original Generals were preceded by teams called the Jackson Jays (1926), Jackson Giants (1925), Jackson Blue Jays (1924), Jackson Climbers (1911), and Jackson Railroaders (1903).

With the Generals gone in 2021, the Winnipeg Goldeyes of the independent American Association temporarily moved their operations to Jackson due to COVID-19 restrictions shutting down the US-Canada border, preventing them from playing in their normal home, Shaw Park in Winnipeg. The Goldeyes played 33 games in Jackson before being given permission by the Canadian government to return across the border on August 3.

After the Generals were dissolved during the canceled 2020 season, the Jackson Generals stadium, known as "The Ballpark at Jackson," became home to a new prospect league known as the Jackson Rockabillys in 2022.

Other sports 
The Hub City Hurricanes of the IBL played in Jackson for one season in 2007.

In 1974, a little league team from Jackson played in the Little League World Series in Williamsport, PA — to date, the only team from West Tennessee to qualify.

From 1990 to 2011, Jackson hosted the NAIA Women's Division I National Championship basketball tournament in the Oman Arena.

Parks and recreation
Jackson hosts the Miss Tennessee Volunteer Pageant.
West Tennessee Healthcare Sportsplex is a travel baseball and softball complex completed in 2007.
 A tennis complex in northern Jackson hosts the City Closed tennis tournament.
 Jackson is home to the Rusty's TV & Movie Car Museum, which hosts a collection of cars that have been shown in TV and film, including the green Mitsubishi Eclipse driven by Paul Walker in the original "Fast and Furious."

Education

Colleges and universities
 Jackson State Community College
 Lane College
 Union University
 University of Memphis at Lambuth
 University of Tennessee at Martin – Jackson Center

The following is near the city but in an unincorporated area:
 Tennessee College of Applied Technology at Jackson

Primary and secondary schools
K-12 public schools in the city and county are operated by the consolidated Jackson-Madison County School System. High schools include:
 Jackson Central-Merry Early College High School
 Liberty Technology Magnet High School
 Madison Academic Magnet High School
 North Side High School
 South Side High School

Specialist schools operated by the State of Tennessee include:
 West Tennessee School for the Deaf

Private schools include:
 Jackson Christian School
 Sacred Heart of Jesus High School
 Trinity Christian Academy
 University School of Jackson

Media

Newspaper
Jackson is served by one daily, The Jackson Sun. The Sun is delivered to 13 counties in total and is considered one of western Tennessee's major newspapers.

Television
As of the 2015–2016 television season, the Jackson television market is the smallest market in Tennessee and 176th overall by Nielsen Media Research. The market is served by three major commercial stations: WBBJ-TV 7 (ABC, with CBS/MeTV on DT3), WJKT 16 (Fox), and WNBJ-LD 39 (NBC). Jackson is also served by a PBS member station, WLJT-DT 11, as well as several other low-power stations (among them Antenna TV/MyNetworkTV affiliate WYJJ-LD 27).

Radio

Jackson is serviced by 28 FM and 8 AM radio stations.

Infrastructure

Transportation

Ground transportation
Interstate 40 runs through the city in an east-west direction, connecting the city with Memphis to the west and Nashville to the east. I-40 has six exits in the city. U.S. Route 45 runs in a north-south direction.

The Jackson Transit Authority line provides intra-city bus service, while the Greyhound Bus line provides inter-city service.

U.S. Route 45, locally known as Highland Avenue, runs north to south to Gibson County and Chester County. A bypass route of US 45 (known as the Keith Short Bypass) goes through the western part of the city.

U.S. Route 412 runs east from Lexington in Henderson County northwest to Dyersburg, Tennessee, and I-55 reaches westward to St. Louis.

U.S. Route 70 or State Route 1 runs east to west between Huntingdon and Brownsville.

Air service
McKellar-Sipes Regional Airport (MKL) serves the city.

Train service
Historically the city was the junction of north-south trains, such as the Illinois Central's City of Miami and east-west trains such as the Nashville, Chattanooga and St. Louis Railway's the City of Memphis.

Healthcare
West Tennessee Healthcare (Jackson-Madison County General Hospital District), created by a law passed by the Tennessee General Assembly in 1949, serves as the public hospital system of the city of Jackson. The city appoints some of the members of the board of directors.

Notable people
 Allison Alderson, former Miss Tennessee
 Monroe Dunaway Anderson, born in Jackson, was a cotton trader and capitalist, whose financial endowment helped found the Anderson, Clayton & Company in Oklahoma City, Oklahoma in 1904, the M. D. Anderson Foundation in Houston, Texas and the University of Texas MD Anderson Cancer Center in Houston.
 Micajah Autry, hero of The Alamo, practiced law in Jackson from 1831 to 1835
 Big Maybelle, R & B singer
 Dick Davis, football player
 Gene Evans, actor, relocated to Jackson after appearing in the film Walking Tall
 Steve Fossett, aviator and the first man to fly solo non-stop around the world in a hot air balloon, was born in Jackson.
 Greg Goff, head baseball coach at Purdue
 Jabari Greer, football player
 Hayes Nance, orthodontist
 Thomas Harris, author noted for his bestseller The Silence of the Lambs, was born in Jackson.
 Sylvester Hicks, NFL player
 Joe Hunter, pianist, one of The Funk Brothers studio band who played on many Motown hits in the 1960s
 Adam Huntsman, lawyer and politician who defeated David Crockett for Congress in 1835
 Luther Ingram, singer
 Casey Jones, Illinois Central Railroad engineer who, before colliding with a stalled freight train near Vaughan, Mississippi, told his fireman to jump to safety. Jones died at the throttle and saved the lives of all the passengers.
 Christopher Jones, actor, was born in Jackson.
 Ed "Too Tall" Jones, football player
 Jacoby Jones, football player attended Lane College in Jackson.
 Van Jones, environmental advocate, civil rights activist, and lawyer, was born in Jackson.
 Fred Lane, football player attended Lane College in Jackson.
 Denise LaSalle, blues singer, known as “Queen of the Blues,” was a resident and business owner in Jackson for many years.
 Ron Lollar, Tennessee state representative
 Wink Martindale, game show host
 Kenny Parchman, rockabilly musician
 JR Payne, women's basketball head coach, University of Colorado
 Carl Perkins, singer, lived for years in Jackson; the Civic Center is named for him.
Casey Prather (born 1991), basketball player in the Israeli Basketball Premier League
 Lauren Pritchard, soul singer, songwriter and actress, known by her stage name Lolo; was born and spent her childhood in Jackson.
 Ron Reynolds, Texas politician, born in Jackson in 1973
 Joe Rogers, Sr. co-founder of Waffle House, born in Jackson in 1919.
 Josh Robbins, HIV/AIDS activist, blogger, social media marketer and talent agent, grew up in Jackson.
 Gil Scott-Heron, musician born in Chicago, Illinois, spent his early childhood in Jackson, at the home of his maternal grandmother.
 Charles Alexander Shaw, United States District Court judge
 Trey Teague, football player
 Isaac Burton Tigrett, co-founder of the Hard Rock Cafe chain of themed restaurants.
 Al Wilson, football player

References

External links

 

 
Cities in Tennessee
Cities in Madison County, Tennessee
County seats in Tennessee
Jackson metropolitan area, Tennessee
1821 establishments in Tennessee
Majority-minority cities and towns in Tennessee